The Kacha is a river in Krasnoyarsk Krai, Russia. It is a right tributary of the Yenisey. The Turkic name of the river is Izyr-Su, and it has been suggested that the Russian name is derived from Izyr-Kichi "Izyr people", the self-name of the Turkic people that inhabited the river valley and adjacent lands.

Course
The Gladkaya Kacha is twice as long as the Krutaya Kacha; it starts in the middle mountainous area and has a deeper valley, while the Krutaya Kacha starts in the relatively flat and boggy area. Both streams flow from the range northward, cross the Trans-Siberian Railway, and join together. Then the river turns eastward near the settlement of Pamyati 13 Bortsov and completes the half loop by turning back southwards to the Yenisey. The Kacha approaches Krasnoyarsk from the north and goes straight through the city, joining the Yenisey in the historical center of the city, Strelka.

Ecology
Kacha has been long known for being the most polluted river of the Krasnoyarsk area, and only in the middle of the 2000s was the situation improved, at least in the Krasnoyarsk section of the river. The most serious pollution sources were several unfiltered sewage pipes and numerous solid wastes on the river banks. Currently, due to the administrative work of the mayor Pyotr Pimashkov, the most of the sources were removed and the river banks in the city center have been turned into an attractive recreational area.

See also
List of rivers of Russia

References

External links
 Комсомольская Правда: Я на Качу ехал плача, возвращался хохоча

Rivers of Krasnoyarsk Krai